Sampoorna Ramayana may refer to:

 Sampoorna Ramayanam (1958 film), a 1958 Tamil film directed by K. Somu
 Sampoorna Ramayanam (1971 film), a 1971 Telugu film directed by Bapu

See also 
 Sampoorna Ramayana, a 1961 Hindi film made by director Babubhai Mistry